Sir Michael Victor Berry,  (born 14 March 1941), is a mathematical physicist at the University of Bristol, England.

He is known for the Berry phase, a phenomenon observed e.g. in quantum mechanics and optics, as well as Berry connection and curvature.  He specialises in semiclassical physics (asymptotic physics, quantum chaos), applied to wave phenomena in quantum mechanics and other areas such as optics.

Education and early life
Berry was brought up in a Jewish family and was the son of a London taxi driver and a dressmaker. Berry has a BSc in physics from the University of Exeter and a PhD from the University of St. Andrews.

Career and research
He has spent his whole career at the University of Bristol: research fellow, 1965–67; lecturer, 1967–74; reader, 1974–78; Professor of Physics, 1978–88; Royal Society Research Professor 1988–2006. Since 2006 he is Melville Wills Professor of Physics (Emeritus) at Bristol University.

Publications
Diffraction of Light by Ultrasound, 1966
Principles of Cosmology and Gravitation, 1976; 
About 395 research papers, book reviews, etc., on physics

Awards and honours
He was elected a Fellow of the Royal Society (FRS) in 1982 and knighted in 1996.  From 2006 to 2012 he was editor of the journal,  Proceedings of the Royal Society A.

Berry has been given the following prizes and awards:

Maxwell Medal and Prize, Institute of Physics, 1978
Elected Fellow of the Royal Society of London, 1982
Elected Fellow of the Royal Society of Arts, 1983
Elected Fellow of the Royal Institution, 1983
Elected Member of the Royal Society of Sciences in Uppsala, Sweden, 1986
Bakerian Lecturer, Royal Society, 1987
Elected member of the European Academy of Sciences and Arts, 1989
Dirac Medal and Prize, Institute of Physics, 1990
Lilienfeld Prize, American Physical Society, 1990
Royal Medal, Royal Society, 1990
Naylor Prize and Lectureship in Applied Mathematics, London Mathematical Society, 1992
Foreign Member: US National Academy of Sciences, 1995
Dirac Medal, International Centre for Theoretical Physics, 1996
Kapitsa Medal, Russian Academy of Sciences, 1997
Wolf Prize for Physics, Wolf Foundation, Israel, 1998
Honorary Fellow of the Institute of Physics, 1999
Forder Lectureship, London Mathematical Society, 1999
Foreign Member: Royal Netherlands Academy of Arts and Sciences, 2000
Ig Nobel Prize for Physics, 2000 (shared with Andre Geim for "The Physics of Flying Frogs"). By 2022 his and Geim's Ig Nobel for the magnetic levitation of a frog was reportedly part of the inspiration for China's lunar gravity research facility.
Onsager Medal, Norwegian Technical University, 2001
Gibbs Lecturer, American Mathematical Society, 2002
1st and 3rd prizes, Visions of Science, Novartis/Daily Telegraph, 2002
Elected to Royal Society of Edinburgh, 2005
Pólya Prize, London Mathematical Society, 2005
Doctor of Science, honoris causa, University of Glasgow, 2007
Doctor of Science, honoris causa, Russian-Armenian (Slavonic) University in Yerevan, 2012
Lorentz Medal, 2014
Lise Meitner Distinguished Lecture, 2019

See also

Gordon decomposition
Hilbert–Pólya conjecture
Riemann hypothesis
Spin-stabilized magnetic levitation
Superoscillation

References

1941 births
Living people
British Jews
Jewish physicists
People educated at Ilford County High School
Academics of the University of Bristol
Alumni of the University of Exeter 
Alumni of the University of St Andrews
British physicists
Donegall Lecturers of Mathematics at Trinity College Dublin
Fellows of the Institute of Physics
Fellows of the Royal Society
Fellows of the Royal Society of Edinburgh
Honorary Fellows of the Institute of Physics
Maxwell Medal and Prize recipients
Members of the American Philosophical Society
Members of the Royal Netherlands Academy of Arts and Sciences
Foreign associates of the National Academy of Sciences
Royal Medal winners
Wolf Prize in Physics laureates
Knights Bachelor